The Asia/Oceania Zone was one of the three zones of the regional Davis Cup competition in 1995.

In the Asia/Oceania Zone there were three different tiers, called groups, in which teams compete against each other to advance to the upper tier. Winners in Group II advanced to the Asia/Oceania Zone Group I. Teams who lost their respective ties competed in the relegation play-offs, with winning teams remaining in Group II, whereas teams who lost their play-offs were relegated to the Asia/Oceania Zone Group III in 1996.

Participating nations

Draw

 and  relegated to Group III in 1996.
 promoted to Group I in 1996.

First round

Pakistan vs. China

Thailand vs. Malaysia

Qatar vs. Uzbekistan

Sri Lanka vs. Iran

Second round

Thailand vs. China

Uzbekistan vs. Sri Lanka

Relegation play-offs

Pakistan vs. Malaysia

Qatar vs. Iran

Third round

Uzbekistan vs. China

References

External links
Davis Cup official website

Davis Cup Asia/Oceania Zone
Asia Oceania Zone Group II